The Taiwan Affairs Office of the State Council is an administrative agency under the State Council of the People's Republic of China. It is responsible for setting and implementing guidelines and policies related to the Republic of China (Taiwan), as stipulated by the Central Committee of the Chinese Communist Party and the State Council itself. Under the arrangement "one institution with two names", the Taiwan Affairs Office is the external name of the Taiwan Work Office of the Central Committee of the CCP. The CCP title is used when dealing with Taiwanese officials on a party-to-party basis.

According to the arrangement and authorization of the State Council, the office takes charge of relevant preparations for negotiations and agreements with what Mainland China calls the "Taiwan authorities" (i.e., the government of the Republic of China and its authorized government organizations). The agency administers and coordinates direct links in mail, transport and trade across the Taiwan Strait, takes charge of the media and publicity work related to the Republic of China, censors and releases news and information concerning Free Area affairs, and handles major incidents related to the Republic of China.

The Taiwan Affairs Council is also responsible for the coordination with overall planning the economic relations and trade related to Taiwan and exchanges and cooperation in such areas as finance, culture, academic research, sports, science and technology, health, and others with the departments concerned. It also manages personnel exchange, observations and symposia between the two sides and relevant work on international conferences involving the Republic of China.

Organizational structure 
 Department of Secretary
 Department of Personnel
 Department of Integration
 Department of Research
 Department of Information
 Department of Economy
 Department of Hong Kong and Macau Affairs Related to Taiwan
 Department of Exchange
 Department of Law and Regulation
 Department of Complaints and Coordination
 CCP Committee Office of the Taiwan Affairs Office

List of directors

List of spokespersons

See also 

 Cross-Strait relations, background
 Mainland Affairs Council, counterpart body in Taiwan
 Association for Relations Across the Taiwan Straits, semi-official contact body
 Straits Exchange Foundation, counterpart semi-official contact body in Taiwan
 Taiwan Province, People's Republic of China
 Hong Kong and Macau Affairs Office
 Ministry of Unification (South Korea)
 Minister of Intra-German Relations

References

External links 
 

1988 establishments in China
Cross-Strait relations
Government agencies established in 1988
Government agencies of China
Organizations based in Beijing
State Council of the People's Republic of China
Institutions of the Central Committee of the Chinese Communist Party
Chinese intelligence agencies
Chinese propaganda organisations
One institution with multiple names